The UK Albums Chart is a weekly record chart based on album sales from Sunday to Saturday in the United Kingdom; during the 1990s, a total of 216 albums reached number one. Until 1 February 1994, the chart was compiled each week by Gallup – after this date, it was managed by Millward Brown, who expanded the number of sales figures sampled, and extended the use of electronic point of sale machines. From July 1998 onwards, compilation of the chart was overseen by the Chart Information Network, jointly operated by the British Phonographic Industry (BPI) and the British Association of Record Dealers. Throughout the decade, the chart was based solely on physical album sales, and each week's number one was first announced on Sunday evenings on The Radio 1 Chart Show.

The most successful artist of the 1990s was British band Simply Red, who topped the UK Albums Chart for 19 weeks with four different albums. Stars, their fourth studio album, sold 3.29 million copies in total, and was the biggest-selling album of both 1991 and 1992. Stars was the second biggest-selling album of the decade; it was outsold by Manchester band Oasis's second album, (What's the Story) Morning Glory?, which spent 10 weeks at number one during 1995 and 1996, and sold 4.16 million copies. It was the highest-certified album of the 1990s, achieving platinum certification 13 times. Following the album's success, Oasis's follow-up, Be Here Now, sold 663,000 copies in the first four days of its release, making it the fastest-selling album in UK chart history.

The first number-one album of the 1990s was ...But Seriously by Phil Collins – released in 1989, ...But Seriously first reached number one in December of that year, and remained at the top for eight weeks. It stayed at number one for nine weeks during the decade, and was the biggest-selling album of 1990. The final number one of the 1990s was Come On Over by Shania Twain. Like ...But Seriously, Come on Over remained at number one into the following decade, and was the biggest-selling album of its year. In chart terms, the most successful album of the nineties was Spice, the debut album from the Spice Girls, which spent 15 weeks at number one over five separate runs. The Spice Girls' record label, Virgin Records, was the most successful label of the decade – with an artist roster that included the Spice Girls, Phil Collins and Meat Loaf, Virgin topped the albums chart with 19 different albums for a total of 62 weeks.

Number ones

By artist

Eight artists spent 12 weeks or more at number one on the album chart during the 1990s.

By record label
Six record labels spent 20 weeks or more at number one on the album chart during the 1990s.

Christmas number ones

In the UK, Christmas number one albums are those that are at the top of the UK Albums Chart on Christmas Day. Typically, this will refer to the album that was announced as number one on the Sunday before 25 December—when Christmas Day falls on a Sunday itself, the official number one is considered by the OCC to be the one announced on that day's chart. During the 1990s, the following albums were Christmas number ones.

Notes

References

External links
 
 The Official UK Top 40 Albums Chart at BBC Radio 1

1990s in British music
United Kingdom Albums
1990s